Ritva Kaarina Dromberg (née Hakula; born 22 May 1942 in Elimäki) is a Finnish politician. She served as Minister of Culture from 5 June 2002 to 17 July 2003. She was a member of the Parliament of Finland from 1983 to 2007, representing the National Coalition Party. She helped create the Network of Finnish Women Members of Parliament.

References

1942 births
Living people
People from Elimäki
National Coalition Party politicians
Ministers of Education of Finland
Members of the Parliament of Finland (1983–87)
Members of the Parliament of Finland (1987–91)
Members of the Parliament of Finland (1991–95)
Members of the Parliament of Finland (1995–99)
Members of the Parliament of Finland (1999–2003)
Members of the Parliament of Finland (2003–07)
Women government ministers of Finland
Women members of the Parliament of Finland
21st-century Finnish women politicians